USS Leonidas may refer to:

 
 

United States Navy ship names